Fagg is an unincorporated community in Montgomery County, Virginia, United States.

History
A post office was established at Fagg in 1886, and remained in operation until it was discontinued in 1910. The community's namesake was George Washington Fagg, a county sheriff.

References

Unincorporated communities in Montgomery County, Virginia
Unincorporated communities in Virginia